Farmcote Grange was a medieval monastic grange at Farmcote in Gloucestershire, England.

It was a grange of Hailes Abbey.

References

Monasteries in Gloucestershire
Temple Guiting